Norman William Taylor (April 15, 1899 – December 14, 1980) was a Canadian rower who competed in the 1924 Summer Olympics. He won a silver medal at the Paris Games as crew member of the Canadian boat in the eights event.

References

External links
databaseOlympics.com profile

1899 births
1980 deaths
Canadian male rowers
Olympic rowers of Canada
Olympic silver medalists for Canada
Rowers at the 1924 Summer Olympics
Olympic medalists in rowing
Medalists at the 1924 Summer Olympics